These are the results of the men's team all-around competition, one of eight events for male competitors in artistic gymnastics at the 1976 Summer Olympics in Montreal.  The compulsory and optional rounds took place on July 18 and 20 at the Montreal Forum.

Medalists

Results
The final score for each team was determined by combining all of the scores earned by the team on each apparatus during the compulsory and optional rounds.  If all six gymnasts on a team performed a routine on a single apparatus during compulsories or optionals, only the five highest scores on that apparatus counted toward the team total.

In the table below "C" stands for "Compulsory exercises" and "O" stands for "Optional exercises".

Team score for each of the routines is the sum of scores of all team members in that routine, except the lowest of them, which is discarded. Total team score is the sum of team's scores in the routines.

References
Official Olympic Report
www.gymnasticsresults.com
www.gymn-forum.net

Men's team all-around
Men's events at the 1976 Summer Olympics